Eoghan Keniry (born 1996) is an Irish hurler who plays for club side Killeagh. He is a former member of the Cork senior hurling team. Keniry usually lines out as a forward.

Career

Keniry first came to hurling prominence at juvenile and underage levels with the Killeagh-St Ita's amalgamation. He simultaneously lined out at colleges' level with Midleton CBS Secondary School before joining the Killeagh senior team. Keniry first appeared on the inter-county scene as a member of the Cork minor hurling team and scored 2–04 in his debut against Kerry in 2014. He spent one season with the Cork under-21 side. Keniry was a member of the extended panel for the Cork senior hurling team at the start of the 2018 season and lined out in the pre-season Munster League.

Career statistics

Club

Honours

Midleton CBS
Dr. O'Callaghan Cup: 2012

Killeagh-St. Ita's
Cork Under-21 B Hurling Championship: 2014

References

1996 births
Living people
Killeagh hurlers
Cork inter-county hurlers